A constitutional referendum was held in Kazakhstan on 30 August 1995. The new constitution was approved by 90.0% of voters, with turnout reported to be 90.6%.

Results

References

Kazakhstan
1995 in Kazakhstan
Referendums in Kazakhstan
Constitutional referendums